Acrossocheilus spinifer is a species of cyprinid fish. It occurs in the upper reaches of rivers and hill streams in Guangdong and Fujian in southern China.

References

Spinifer
Fish described in 2006
Cyprinid fish of Asia
Freshwater fish of China
Endemic fauna of China